Charles "Chuck" Marstiller Vest (September 9, 1941 – December 12, 2013) was an American mechanical engineer and academic administrator. He served as President of the Massachusetts Institute of Technology from October 1990 until December 2004.  He succeeded Paul Gray and was succeeded by Susan Hockfield. He served as president of the National Academy of Engineering from 2007 to 2013.

Education and career
Vest was born in Morgantown, West Virginia, in 1941. He went to Morgantown High School.

Vest received a Bachelor of Science with a major in mechanical engineering from from West Virginia University in 1963. He received a Master of Science in Engineering in 1964 and a Doctor of Philosophy in 1967, both in mechanical engineering from the University of Michigan, where he later served as professor of mechanical engineering.

Vest served as dean of the College of Engineering at the University of Michigan from 1986 to 1989 and provost of the university from 1989 to 1990. He then served as president of MIT from 1990 to 2004.

In 2004, a selection of Vest's speeches from his time as President of MIT was published under the title, Pursuing the Endless Frontier: Essays on MIT and the Role of Research Universities.

Cambridge University awarded him an honorary doctorate in law in 2006. Harvard University has also given him an honorary degree in 2005. In 2011 Tufts University awarded him an honorary doctorate in science; the same year he delivered the Tufts University Commencement address.

Other activities
Vest served on the President’s Council of Advisors on Science and Technology and chaired the Task Force on the Future of Science Programs at the Department of Energy. At the request of President Bill Clinton, he chaired the Committee on the Redesign of the International Space Station, which revitalized the space station at a time when its future was in question. On February 6, 2004, he was appointed to the Iraq Intelligence Commission by President George W. Bush.

He was appointed the president of the National Academy of Engineering in 2007 and served until 2013. Vest was a member of the USA Science and Engineering Festival's Advisory Board. He was a Fellow of the American Academy of Arts & Sciences and served as co-chair of the Academy's Science, Engineering & Technology Policy Program. In 2008, Vest was elected an honorary academician of Academia Sinica.

On December 12, 2013, he died of pancreatic cancer, aged 72.

References

External links
National Academy of Engineering page

 Chuck Vest Playlist Appearance on WMBR's Dinnertime Sampler radio show March 31, 2004

1941 births
American mechanical engineers
DuPont people
Educators from West Virginia
2013 deaths
MIT School of Engineering faculty
Morgantown High School alumni
National Medal of Technology recipients
People from Morgantown, West Virginia
Presidents of the Massachusetts Institute of Technology
University of Michigan College of Engineering alumni
University of Michigan faculty
West Virginia University alumni
Engineers from West Virginia
Members of the United States National Academy of Engineering
Deaths from pancreatic cancer
Henry Laurence Gantt Medal recipients
Members of Academia Sinica
Foreign members of the Chinese Academy of Engineering